Six-eyed spiders are spiders that, unlike most spider species miss the principal pair of eyes, leaving them with only six eyes instead of the usual eight.

List
This list is incomplete
Araneomorphae
Haplogynae
Scytodoidea-superfamily of six-eyed spiders 
Drymusidae
Periegopidae
Scytodes
Sicariidae
Leptonetoidea-superfamily of six-eyed spiders
Leptonetidae
Ochyroceratidae
Telemidae-predominantly six-eyed, but some species with none.
Pholcoidea
Diguetidae-family of six-eyed spiders
Pholcidae-predominantly eight eyed, but some species with six.
Pholcinae
Belisana
Belisana aliformis (at Wikispecies)
Belisana huberi (at Wikispecies)
Belisana lamellaris (at Wikispecies)
Belisana zhangi (at Wikispecies)
Khorata
Khorata diaoluoshanensis (at Wikispecies) 
Caponioidea
Caponiidae-family with species with 8, 6, 4 and 2 eyes and some with a changing number of eyes
Tetrablemmidae
Dysderoidea-superfamily of six-eyed spiders
Dysderidae
Oonopidae
Orsolobidae
Segestriidae
Trogloraptoridae
Entelegynae
Archaeoidea
Micropholcommatidae
Micropholcommatinae
Micropholcommatini
Austropholcomma
Austropholcomma walpole (at Wikispecies)
Araneoidea
Anapidae
Comaroma
Comaroma hatsushibai (at Wikispecies)
Dictynoidea
Cybaeidae
Cybaeus
Cybaeus yoshiakii (at Wikispecies)
Dictynidae-predominantly eight eyed, but some species with six.

References

Bibliography

External links

Six eyes
Spider anatomy
Eye